Igor Petrovich Koronov (born 6 April 1986) is a Russian former professional football player. He played as a right midfielder.

Club career
Koronov has played in the Russian Premier League with PFC Spartak Nalchik and FC Orenburg.

External links
Profile at Footballfacts.ru
 Profile at KAMAZ official site

1986 births
Living people
People from Naberezhnye Chelny
Russian footballers
Russia youth international footballers
Russia national football B team footballers
Association football midfielders
FC KAMAZ Naberezhnye Chelny players
FC Gornyak Uchaly players
PFC Spartak Nalchik players
FC Orenburg players
FC Tyumen players
Russian Premier League players
FC Neftekhimik Nizhnekamsk players
Sportspeople from Tatarstan